Iowa Correctional Institution for Women is an Iowa Department of Corrections medium/minimum security prison located in Mitchellville, Iowa. As of 2002 it had some 190 staff and 510 inmates.

It has both dormitory style units and celled housing, as well as a "return-to-confinement" facility used for intensive treatment of repeat offenders who violate parole.

References

External links
 https://web.archive.org/web/20121222090443/http://www.doc.state.ia.us/InstitutionDesc.asp

Women's prisons in the United States
Prisons in Iowa
Buildings and structures in Polk County, Iowa
Women in Iowa